Salvador Romualdo del Rosario (born October 24, 1944), nicknamed, The Mighty Mite, is a Filipino weightlifter who competed at the 1968, 1972 and 1976 Summer Olympics with a best finish of ninth in 1972 and 1972.

Athletic career

1963 
Del Rosario began serious training in competitive weightlifting in January under the expert guidance of his uncle, Rodrigo Del Rosario. The older Del Rosario was responsible for the Philippines only points in the XIV Olympic Games held at London in 1948 and duplicated the same feat at the Helsinki Olympiad in 1952 together with teammate Pedro Landero.

With roughly five months of preparation behind him, Salvador took part in his first competition in the National Junior Weightlifting Championships held at the Rizal Open Arena on June 30, 1963 along with 19 other budding strong men. Competing under the colors of Far Eastern University and weighing only 106.25 lbs., he cut the flyweight diadem with a compilation of 455 lbs. which was more than a hundred and fifty pounds below the Philippine National Record. He was at the time only 18 years old and his auspicious debut delighted local weightlifting circles.

One month later, he was pitted against the best lifters of Luzon in the Regional Meet held at Baguio City. He exceeded his lift performance in the Junior Tournament by fifteen pounds but this was only good for the 6th place - in a field of 6 flyweight lifters.

Instead of being discouraged, Del Rosario burned more calories in his workouts in a determined effort to keep up and eventually surpassed the leaders in his class. In another six weeks, he was given the task of representing Far Eastern University in the 1965 National Student Meet. This time he broke the 500 lbs barrier by registering a total of 515 lbs. a good fifty pounds over his record in his maiden appearance. However, he was still sixty pounds behind teammate, Arcadio Lacsamana, the winner. Later, in a special tryout, he qualified for the 1963 National "Open" Meet to be held at Cebu City.

For the National Championships at the Aznar Coliseum in Cebu where all of the nation's strongest athletes converged, the FEU team coach found out that Salvador's chances in the flyweight category were very slim. So a last-minute decision was made to increase his body weight and compete in the next higher class - the Bantam, where there would be less competition. The decision paid off when Salvador earned 3rd place and was awarded a trophy for the first time.

1964 
After the 1963 National Tournament, while most of his colleagues just took it easy, Salvador plugged on harder and harder. He bypassed the Regional Meet held in Dagupan City in April 1964 and instead focused all his effort on the National Open slated in August. He was entered in the flyweight class, after his last lift and scores were computed, the Meet officials credited him with a respectable total of 580 pounds which earned him 3rd place honor. A feat that was remarkable at that time despite the fact that he tried to break a Philippine record though in futility.

A month before he celebrated his 20th birthday, his team participated in the National Teenage Tourney at Batangas. He bested two other contenders for the flyweight class wherein the total poundage was recorded at 595 pounds.

1965 
During the 1965 Luzon Regional Meet at Olongapo, Zambales, del Rosario for the first time officially broke the 600 pound weightlifting barrier when he made 605 lbs to earn the silver medal. However, he did edge out highly favored Godofredo Canlas, a several time National Champion, a record holder and the Philippine Representative to the 111 Asian Games at Tokyo, Japan.

For the National Championships at Bacolod City, del Rosario clinched his first national crown - the flyweight weightlifting title while breaking a national record. His 226 lbs. lift exceeded the former mark by 6-1/2 lbs. In addition, he earned the right to represent the Philippines in the 1965 World and Asia Meet that was held in Tehran, Iran.

At his international tournament debut, under the guidance of his uncle who acted as his coach, del Rosario earned runner up honors in the Asian portion of the championships, the best performance so far for any Filipino flyweight weightlifter. The winner in his class, Chaiya Sushida of Thailand, was considered the unofficial world champion.

In addition to these honors, del Rosario was chosen by the Philippine Sportswriters Association (PSA) as the Weightlifter of the Year. With this esteemed honor he received the prestigious (PSA) plaque.

In summary, for 1965, the competitions he joined, records established, and awards received are as follows:

 World and Asian Meets (Tehran, Iran): Silver Medalist
 Philippines Sportswriters Association: Weightlifter of the Year
 National Championships: Gold Medalist and new National record
 Luzon Regional Meet: Silver Medalist

1966 
In a remarkable year for the Philippine Sports, del Rosario established an unofficial world record of 273 lbs that paved the way for winning his second National Open Title.

He represented the Philippines in the 4th Asian Games at Bangkok, Thailand. Despite his breaking a national record in this game, he landed 4th place due to a costly technical issue raised. However, he was once again awarded the PSA's Weightlifter of the Year.

For 1966, the competitions he joined, record established, and awards received are as follows:

 4th Asian Games (Bangkok, Thailand): 4th Place
 Philippine Sportswriters Association: Weightlifter of the Year
 Established Unofficial World Record: 273 lbs. in Clean and Jerk Event
 Philippine National Champion
 Most Outstanding Lifter award

1967 
Del Rosario established two National marks: 220 - 1/4 lbs. lift in the Press Event and 666-1/2 lbs. for the total. He earned his 3rd PSA Weightlifter of the Year award. Moreover, he earned a presidential citation and a plaque that was personally awarded by former President Ferdinand E. Marcos during the 1st Philippine Sports Festival held at the Rizal Football Field in December.

During 1967, the competitions joined, records established, and awards received are as follows:
 PSA: Weightlifter of the Year
 Award: Presidential Citation and Plaque
 Established: two Philippine National Records

1968 
Since the flyweight category is not contested in the Olympic weightlifting sports, it was decided that Salvador compete in the Bantamweight category. During this Olympiad del Rosario was the first and only Filipino to reach the 700 lbs. barrier. This entitled him to an award given by the International Weightlifting Federation to elite lifters from all over the world who had successfully achieved the standards prescribed by the body.

At the National Open Championships in Davao City, he brought back home with him two huge trophies for his record-breaking performances. He achieved the Most Outstanding Lifter in the competition. No other Filipino had attained this award in the National Competition.

Del Rosario was chosen team captain of the Philippine Republic weightlifting contingent for the XIX Olympic Games in Mexico City. He had a good start but due to technicalities raised, some of his easy lifts were disqualified. His display of sportsmanship in the Olympiad earned Salvador another plaque: for the 4th consecutive time, he was awarded the Weightlifter of the Year.

During 1968, the competitions he joined, records established, and awards received are as follows:

 First awardee: Badge of Honor and Trophy'''
 Award: Most Outstanding Lifter Award: Philippine National Champion and Best Lifter Achievement: Broke all the National Standing Records Team captain and Olympic competitor in Mexico City

 1969 

Salvador returned to the Flyweight Class and won back the title he used to dominate at the first major competition of the year - the 23rd Luzon Open Meet held at Aguinaldo gym on August 28.

During 1969, the competitions joined, records established, and awards received are as follows:

 Philippine National Champion
 Most Outstanding Lifter
 PSA award: Most Outstanding Lifter Regional Championship (FEU Gym July 20): Champion 1970 
For the 1970 competitions he joined, records established, and awards received are as follows:

 24th Luzon Open Meet (Olongapo City, 17 May): Most Outstanding Lifter Trophy National Open Championship (Christ the King College, San Fernando, La Union July 4): * Established a Philippine Record in the Olympic Snatch Event * Most Outstanding Lifter * Flyweight Category Winner
 Tryout for the 6th Asian Games (P. W. A. Manila): * Broke the Philippine Records in the Olympic Snatch Event, Clean and Jerk Event and a total of three Olympic events. * Qualified for the 6th Asian Games in Bangkok, Thailand.
 XXIVth World Weightlifting Championship (Ohio State University, Columbus, Ohio, USA September 12): * Broke the Philippine Records in the Olympic Snatch Event, the latter exceeded the existing Asian record by 5 kilograms. 11 lbs. * Won the overall championship in the Flyweight category, in a field of 12 outstanding lifters. * Awarded gold medals in the Snatch and Clean and Jerk events.
 Competition at PAFF Citation Day (Indoor Gym, Manila, October 12)
 PWA Thanksgiving Day: Del Rosario Day (November 28)
 Competition at VIth Asian Games (Exhibition Hall Stadium, Bangkok, Thailand, December 9): * First in Clean and Jerk Event for the Flyweight Category * Runner up in the Overall Standing in the Flyweight Category
 Competition at AFP Little Olympics: Champion 1971 
In 1971 the competitions he joined, records established, and awards received are as follows:

 25th National Open Championships (Bulacan Provincial Stadium, Malolos, Bulacan, July 23): * Winner in the Flyweight Class * Awardee of the Outstanding Leader trophy
 1st Asian Weightlifting Champions (FEU Auditorium, Manila, October 8–10): * Winner in the Flyweight Class * Equaled the standing world record in the Clean and Jerk events
 11th AFP Little Olympics (Teano Hall, Fort Bonifacio, Rizal, November 21 – December 1):  * Broke the Philippine Record in the Snatch Event * Won the Gold Medal in the Flyweight Class
 Award: PSA Athlete of the Year 1972 
During 1972, the competitions he joined, records established, and awards received are as follows:

 Palarong Pilipino (Simultaneously the National Championships for Weightlifting, PAFF Gymnasium, Manila, June 20): * Broke the Philippine Record for the Snatch Event * Won the gold medal in the Flyweight class * Named the Most Outstanding Athlete in the whole Palaro or Philippine Games
 Member, Philippine Delegation to the 20th World Olympic Games in Munich, West Germany
 1st Northern Luzon Open Meet (Bangued, Abra, February 19–22): Champion 1973 
For 1973, the competitions he joined, records established, and awards received are as follows:

 Second Palarong Pilipino (Rizal Memorial Indoor Gym, Manila, 21 May): * Winner in the Flyweight Class * Most Outstanding Lifter
 27th World Weightlifting Championships (Havana, Cuba, September 15): * Finished 9th among a field of 32 participants
 First RP - Korea Goodwill matches (University of Baguio): * Gold medal in the Flyweight Class

 1974 
In 1974, the competitions he joined, records established, and awards received are as follows:

 2nd Northern Luzon Weightlifting Championships (Candon, Ilocos Sur, March 22): * Winner Flyweight Class Gold Medal * Award: Best Lifter Trophy 3rd Palarong Pilipino competition (PAAF Indoor Gym, Manila, June 5): * Flyweight National Champion
 7th Asian Games (Tehran, Iran, September 1–16): * 5th place in the Flyweight Category
 20th World Championships (Rizal Memorial Coliseum, Manila, September 21–29): * 8th place in the 13-man field after lifting 92.5 kg in the Snatch and 122.5 kg in the Clean and Jerk
 Tryout for the RP Lifting to the New Zealand Games (PWA Gym, Manila, November 21): * Broke the 4-year-old record in the Olympic Snatch event

 1975 
During 1975, the competitions he joined, records established, and awards received are as follows:

 Competition: (Manila Overseas Press Club, Manila, April 4): * Award: first All Filipino Sports Award Trophy 2nd All Filipino Sports Awards Presentation (Folk Arts Theater, Manila, 3 May): * Winner of the AFSA trophy: Weightlifter of 1974 Intercity Weightlifting Championships (Tokyo, Japan, November 2): * Gold medalist in the Olympic Jerk Event
 29th National Open Weightlifting Championships (UP Diliman, Quezon City, December 15–16): * Flyweight Champion * Award: Most Outstanding Trophy * 10th Consecutive Year being the Most Outstanding Weightlifter * 10th year winning the Most Outstanding Weightlifter 1976 
For 1976, the competitions he joined, records established, and awards received are as follows:

 Competition at Olympic Games (Montreal, Canada, July 18): * Only Olympic point winner
 Competition at Regional Championship (Angono, Rizal, November 28): * Champion * Most Outstanding Lifter
 30th National Open (UP Gym, December 11): * Champion, Flyweight Class * Outstanding Lifter
 Battle of the Champions (Dagupan City, December 19–20): * Champion

 1977 
In 1977, the competitions he joined, records established, and awards received are as follows:

 Asian Weightlifting Championships (Singapore, September 3–4): * Gold medal (Snatch) * Gold medal (Clean and Jerk) * Gold medal (total)
 21st National Open (Agoo, La Union, December 11–12): * Winner Flyweight category (Gold medal) * Most Outstanding Lifter
 11th SEA Games (Kuala Lumpur, Malaysia, November 26): * Silver Medal (Snatch) * Silver Medal (Clean and Jerk) * Silver Medal (total)

 1978 
During 1978, the competitions he joined, records established, and awards received are as follows:

 4 ASEAN Weightlifting Championships (Manila, Philippines, June 22): * Winner Flyweight Category
 Fil-Am Weightlifting Championship (Clark Air Base, Angeles City, July 4): * Champion * Most Outstanding Lifter
 10th SEA Games (Jakarta, Indonesia, September 22): * 2 Gold medals * 1 bronze medal
 33rd National Open (Tagbilaran City, November 4–6): * Silver medalist

 1980 
For 1980, the competitions he joined, records established, and awards received are as follows:

 12th Asian Weightlifting Championships (Seoul, Korea, April 22–24): * 1 Gold medal * 2 Silver medals 
 4th Battle of Strength (Bayombong, Pangasinan, March 4–5): * Champion, Gold Medal
 Southern and Regional Weightlifting Championships (Philtrade, Manila): * Champion * Most Outstanding Weightlifter * 3 Gold medals * Broke 3 records in National Light-flyweight Division
 America Cup (Honolulu, Hawaii, October 24–27): * Earned 6th place
 34th National Open (Zamboanga City, November 21–23): * Silver medal
 15th Intercommand (AFP) Little Olympics (PAF Gym, December 7)
 6th ASEAN Weightlifting Championships (Jakarta, Indonesia, December 19–21): * Gold Medal (Snash) * Gold Medal (Clean and Jerk) * Gold Medal (Total)
 Philippines Sportswriter Association (January 12): * Weightlifter of the Year
 Qualified for Moscow Olympic Games - 1980
 Crossfield Supergames II (Rizal Stadium, March 2): * Tug-of-war participant, Champion

 1981 
In 1981, the competitions he joined, records established, and awards received are as follows:

 New Zealand Summer Games (January 30–31): * 2nd over-all * 1st in the Olympic Jerk competition
 Philippine Sportswriter Association (January 12): * Award: Most Outstanding Lifter Philippine Weightlifting Association (March 11): * Award: PWA Recognition Award''
 35th National Open (Batangas National High School, Batangas City, October 21–24): * Champion * Most Outstanding Lifter
 11th SEA Games (Manila, December 6–12): * 2 Silver medals * 1 Bronze medal

1982 
During 1982, the competitions he joined, records established, and awards received are as follows:

 AFP Little Olympics (23–30 May): * Champion
 1st Powerlifting (R.P. July 3–4): * Champion * Strongest Man Trophy

Athletic record

References

External links
 

1944 births
Living people
Filipino male weightlifters
Olympic weightlifters of the Philippines
Weightlifters at the 1968 Summer Olympics
Weightlifters at the 1972 Summer Olympics
Weightlifters at the 1976 Summer Olympics
Asian Games medalists in weightlifting
Weightlifters at the 1966 Asian Games
Weightlifters at the 1970 Asian Games
Weightlifters at the 1974 Asian Games
Medalists at the 1970 Asian Games
Sportspeople from Zambales
Far Eastern University alumni
Asian Games silver medalists for the Philippines
Philippine Sports Hall of Fame inductees
20th-century Filipino people